Johann Heinrich Friedrich Karl Witte (July 1, 1800 in Lochau (now part of Schkopau) – March 6, 1883 in Halle) was a German jurist and scholar of Dante Alighieri.

Biography
Karl Witte was the son of pastor Karl Heinrich Gottfried Witte (1767–1845) who encouraged a fairly intense program of learning. When Karl Witte was nine, he spoke German, French, Italian, Latin, and Greek, and on April 10, 1814, at the age of 13, he became a doctor of philosophy at the University of Giessen in Germany. As a result, Witte was listed in The Guinness Book of World Records as the "youngest doctorate", a record that still stands; however, The Guinness Book of World Records lists his age as 12.

Witte was the subject of a book written by his father: The Education of Karl Witte: Or, The Training of the Child. This book attracted criticism and soon fell into oblivion in Germany.

He achieved his reputation as a Dante scholar in 1823 with his essay "The Art of Misunderstanding Dante".

References

External links
 
 
 "The Art of Misunderstanding Dante" in 

1800 births
1883 deaths
Leipzig University alumni
German Byzantinists
German jurists
German philosophers
Italian–German translators
19th-century German translators
Dante scholars